Berry House may refer to:

in the United States
(by state, then city/town)
Berry House (Palmer, Alaska)
Berry House (Beebe, Arkansas)
Berry House (Dardanelle, Arkansas)
George O. Berry House, Columbus, Georgia
Thomas A. Berry House, Dalton, Georgia
Dr. William E. and Ethel Rosenberger Berry House, Oskaloosa, Iowa
George F. Berry House, Frankfort, Kentucky, listed on the National Register of Historic Places (NRHP)
Richard Berry Jr. House (Springfield, Kentucky)
Frank A. and Elizabeth Berry House, Faribault, Minnesota, listed on the NRHP
Captain James Berry House, Harwich, Massachusetts
Burnette–Berry House, Kansas City, Missouri
Chuck Berry House, St. Louis, Missouri
Martin Berry House, Pompton Plains, New Jersey
Yereance–Berry House, Rutherford, New Jersey
Col. Sidney Berry House, Northumberland, New York
Richard Berry Jr. House (Columbus, Ohio)
Luke D. Berry House, Cushing, Oklahoma, listed on the NRHP
James E. Berry House, Stillwater, Oklahoma
Berry House (Stephenville, Texas), listed on the NRHP
J. S. Berry House, Waxahachie, Texas, listed on the NRHP